Ebodina is a genus of moths belonging to the family Tortricidae.

Species
Ebodina circensis  Meyrick, 1928
Ebodina elephantodes  Meyrick, 1938
Ebodina lagoana  Razowski & Tuck, 2000
Ebodina lithoptila  Diakonoff, 1960
Ebodina simplex  Diakonoff, 1968
Ebodina sinica  Liu & Bai, 1986

References

 , 2005: World Catalogue of Insects volume 5 Tortricidae.
 , 1968, Bulletin of the United States National Museum 257(1967): 34.
 , 2000: Revision of Ebodina Diakonoff, 1968, with description of two new species and one allied genus (Lepidoptera: Tortricidae). Journal of Polish Entomology 69 (1): 77-86.

External links
tortricidae.com

Polyorthini
Tortricidae genera
Taxa named by Alexey Diakonoff